Papyrus 133 (designated as 𝔓133 in the Gregory-Aland numbering system), is an early copy of the New Testament in Greek. It is a papyrus manuscript of the First Epistle to Timothy. The text survives on several fragments of a single leaf containing parts of verses 3:13-16 and 4:1-8. The manuscript has been assigned paleographically to the middle of the 3rd century.

Location 
𝔓133 is housed at the Sackler Library (P. Oxy. 81 5259) at the University of Oxford.

Textual Variants 

 3:13: It omits  (to you).
 4:6: According to the reconstruction of Shao, it contains the Alexandrian sequence  (Christ Jesus).

See also 

 List of New Testament papyri

References 

New Testament papyri
3rd-century biblical manuscripts
Early Greek manuscripts of the New Testament